Nanima Kariba Rural LLG (formerly Aseki Rural LLG) is a local-level government (LLG) of Morobe Province, Papua New Guinea.

Wards
02. Oiwa
15. Haukini
17. Wangini
18. Bainu
19. Poiyu
21. Aseki Station
24. Damnga
25. Pakea
26. Yangaiyu
27. Wapa
28. Tawa Station
29. Yeva
30. Kokea
31. Wingia

References

Local-level governments of Morobe Province